That's the Stuff is the second studio album by the American glam metal band Autograph, released in 1985 by RCA Records. The album featured the singles "That's the Stuff" and "Blondes in Black Cars."

A different version of the album was reissued in 1986, featuring a blue cover with different artwork. This version featured a cover of Grand Funk Railroad's "We're an American Band" replacing "Six String Fever" as track 6.

A remastered version of the original album with the red cover was released by Spitfire Records in 2002, which retained the same track listing as the original, apart from the substitution of "Six String Fever" with "We're an American Band" as track number 6. Since its remastered release in 2002, the CD has become extremely rare. The album was again reissued in 2009 by the British record label Rock Candy. This time, the remastered CD featured the ten original tracks (including "Six String Fever") and "We're an American Band" as a bonus track. The booklet features the original red cover.

Track listing

Personnel
Autograph
Steve Plunkett – lead vocals, rhythm guitar
Steve Lynch – lead guitar, backing vocals
Randy Rand – bass, backing vocals
Steven Isham – keyboards, backing vocals
Keni Richards – drums

Production
Eddie DeLena – producer, engineer
Craig Engel – engineer
Tom Treumuth – basic tracks producer
Dave Wittman – mixing
Stephen Marcussen – mastering at Precision Lacquer, Hollywood
Neil Zlozower – photography

Charts

Album

Singles

Blondes in Black Cars

References

1985 albums
Autograph (American band) albums
RCA Records albums
Spitfire Records albums